Asia Netball , formerly the Asian Netball Federation, Asian Federation of Netball Associations (AFNA) and Netball Asia, is the governing body of netball in Asia. Netball Asia was founded in 1986 in Kuala Lumpur, Malaysia, three years after representatives from five Asian netball countries – Hong Kong, Malaysia, Singapore, Sri Lanka and India – met during the 1983 Netball World Championships in Singapore to discuss the creation of an Asian netball governing body. The current president of the AFNA is Anna Wong. The Asian Region covers a total of 49 countries. The Asian Region currently has 8 Associate Members and 10 Full Regional & INF Members.

Full members

 Australia (Netball Australia)
 Bangladesh (Bangladesh Netball Association)
 Brunei (Brunei Netball Association)
 Chinese Taipei (Chinese Taipei Netball Association)
 Hong Kong (Hong Kong Netball Association)
 India (Netball Federation of India)
 Japan (Japan Netball Association)
 South Korea (Korean Netball Association)
 Malaysia (Malaysian Netball Association)
 Maldives (Netball Association Of Maldives)
 Nepal (Nepal Netball Association)
 Pakistan (Pakistan Netball Federation)
 Philippines (Netball Philippines)
 Singapore (Netball Singapore)
 Sri Lanka (Netball Federation of Sri Lanka)
 Thailand (Netball Thailand Association)
 Timor Leste (Netball Timor Leste)

Associate members

 Bahrain (Bahrain Netball)
 Macau (Macau Netball Association)

References

External links
Asia Netball

 
Netball
Sports organizations established in 1986
1986 establishments in Malaysia